Lake June in Winter, on the west side of Lake Placid, Florida, has a surface area of . This lake is also written "Lake June-in-Winter" and was once known as Lake Stearns. The lake is kidney-shaped, with coves on the northeast and northwest. Lake June is bordered on the south, some of the east and much of the north by residences and residential areas. The entire western shore is bordered by Lake June in Winter Scrub State Park. Other areas are bordered by vacant areas of scrub and grassland. Two nearby lakes, Lake Henry (Florida) and Lake Lachard are near the lake's shores.

Lake June has public access along much of its shoreline. Lake June-in-Winter Scrub State Park occupies the entire west side of the lake. This park has trails and a picnic area with tables and a shelter. The description of the park in the Florida State Park website says the public is allowed to fish from shore and launch canoes or kayaks from shore. The lake has two other public parks on its shores. One is the Lake June Park Sports Complex, at the south side of the northeast cove. This park has softball diamonds, picnic tables, a swimming beach and a public boat ramp. The other is almost opposite this park, on the north side of the same cove.  This is H. L. Bishop Park, with picnic tables, a fishing dock and a public boat ramp. Two canals connect to area lakes. The one connecting to Lake August, to the south, cannot be navigated. The one going north from the northwest cove connects to Lake Carrie.

According to the Take Me Fishing website, Lake June contains largemouth bass and bluegill.

References

June in Winter
June in Winter